Tabuyin Khwe also Dapeyinkhwe() is a village located in Sagaing Region, Sagaing Township in Myanmar. Mu River (Mu Myit) is flowing at the western of Tabuyin Khwe village. The village's main source of income is mango cultivation.

Nature
Tabuyin Khwe  Village is located in Sagaing Township, Sagaing Region, Myanmar. There are over 800 families in the village. There are five monasteries and one BasicEducation Hight School. All of the villagers are farmers. A few people are fishermen. As it is located along the Mu River, the villagers can grow crops well. They usually grow all kinds of peas and beans, wheat, and various vegetables. The village's 
main source of income is mango cultivation.

Location
Tabuyin Khwe Village is a Village  of Sagaing Township, Sagaing District, Sagaing Region, Myanmar.

References

Populated places in Sagaing District